The third season of Idol premiered in Sweden on August 29, 2006, and continued until its grand finale on December 1, when 24-year-old Markus Fagervall from Övertorneå was crowned winner. The series gained a record-breaking 1.1 million viewers during its first episode, and was the last season to feature Claes af Geijerstam as a judge, who left the series citing financial issues.

Judges
 Daniel Breitholtz – Sony BMG manager
 Peter Swartling – Record producer
 Kishti Tomita – Vocal coach
 Claes af Geijerstam – Musician

Hosts
 Tobbe Blom
 Johan Wiman

Auditions
Malmö: April 6, 2006
Gothenburg: April 22, 2006
Falun: April 30, 2006
Umeå: May 6, 2006
Stockholm: May 13, 2006

More than 6000 people auditioned.

The Top 11 Finalists
 Cissi Ramsby, 20, Järvsö | Audition song: "Aint No Sunshine"
 Danny Saucedo, 20, Stockholm | Audition song: "I Swear"
 Erik Segerstedt, 23, Uddevalla | Audition song: "Feeling Good"
 Felicia Brandström, 19, Floda | Audition song: "Dreams Come True"
 Jessica Myrberg, 22, Gothenburg | Audition song: "Because Of You"
 Johan Larsson, 18, Vänersborg | Audition song: "Show Me Heaven"
 Jonas Snäckmark, 20, Halmstad | Audition song: "You Raise Me Up"
 Linda Seppänen, 21, Tungelsta | Audition song: "Sick Of It All"
 Markus Fagervall, 24, Övertorneå | Audition song: "Red"
 Natalie Kadric, 21, Bålsta | Audition song: "Hot Stuff"
 Sara Burnett, 19, Karlstad | Audition song: "I Know What Love Is"

Semi Final Qualifyings
Top 20
Format: Two out of five semi-finalists made it to the live finals each day (competing in gender-divided groups), based on public phone voting. Two additional semi-final contestants who had not initially gained enough votes was also chosen by the public to advance to the finals, along with a wildcard chosen by the judges.

Finals Elimination Chart

Elimination chart

Idol 2006 album

Det bästa från Idol 2006 (The Best from Idol 2006) is a sampling Swedish Idol 2007 shows. It was released on 21 November 2007.

External links
 Official homepage (Swedish lang.)

Idol (Swedish TV series)
2006 in Swedish music
2006 Swedish television seasons